William O'Hare may refer to:
 William F. O'Hare, American-born bishop of the Catholic Church
 William H. O'Hare, American lawyer and politician from New York